Pat Moylan (born 12 September 1946) is a former Irish Fianna Fáil politician and member of Seanad Éireann.

Born in Banagher, County Offaly, where he still lives, he is married with three sons and one daughter.

A member of Offaly County Council from 1975 to 2004, Moylan was elected in 1997 to the 21st Seanad by the Agricultural Panel. In 2002, he was nominated by the Taoiseach Bertie Ahern as a member of the 22nd Seanad, where he was Fianna Fáil spokesperson on Tourism, Sport and Recreation and was a member of the Joint House Services Committee. He was elected to the 23rd Seanad by the Agricultural Panel in 2007.

He was elected as Cathaoirleach (chair) of the Seanad on 13 September 2007. He did not contest the 2011 Seanad election.

References

1946 births
Living people
Cathaoirligh of Seanad Éireann
Fianna Fáil senators
Irish farmers
Local councillors in County Offaly
Members of the 21st Seanad
Members of the 22nd Seanad
Members of the 23rd Seanad
Nominated members of Seanad Éireann